Ordinary World is a 2016 comedy-drama film written and directed by Lee Kirk. The film stars Billie Joe Armstrong in his first leading role, as well as Judy Greer, Selma Blair, Madisyn Shipman, Dallas Roberts, Chris Messina, Fred Armisen, Brian Baumgartner, and Kevin Corrigan. Filming began late 2014 in New York City. The film was originally screened at the Tribeca as Geezer, before its title was changed to Ordinary World, named after a song heard in the film. It is also the closing track on Green Day's 2016 album Revolution Radio, which was released a week earlier.

Plot 
In 1995, Perry Miller performs in New York with his punk band known as The Skunks. His band gives a brief interview before they play their song "Devil's Kind".

Twenty years later, Perry and his band have parted. Forced to accept his new life, Miller reluctantly lives his lifestyle as a father of two with his hard-working lawyer wife Karen, his talented guitar-playing daughter Salome and his newborn child. On his birthday, the same day as his daughter's talent show, Perry is disappointed to notice that nobody has remembered his birthday. After picking up his daughter's new guitar his wife picked out for her, Perry arrives at work at his family's hardware store where his little brother Jake has accepted the main responsibility. His brother chastises him on his constant lethargy at work until Perry reveals to him that his family forgot his birthday. Upset for him, Jake gives Perry the day off and $1000 to do whatever he wishes to, hopeful that giving him a day to relax will allow him to overcome what has been causing his apathy.

Perry eventually finds a nice hotel where he plans to throw a reunion party for his band. While waiting to rent a room, Perry runs into Christy, an old girlfriend of his when he was in the band. She reveals she is now a manager for Joan Jett, who is performing in New York that night. Soon after, Perry rents the presidential suite from the pristine no-nonsense owner, who firmly reminds him that the hotel has a strict "no-party" policy. After purchasing the room for the day, he calls his old bandmates; just after they arrive, Perry is reminded by his wife that he must let his in-laws into the house that he forgot about. In his absence, his drummer Gary excitedly invites a stripper and many others into the hotel room.

After receiving scornful comments from his wife's parents about his lack of ambition in life, Perry returns to work to fetch Salome's guitar; accidentally, he interrupts a meeting with Jake's lawyer discussing buying out Perry's share of the family business, citing his father's will. Jake tells him that he seems confused in his actions; when he reveals that he has already consulted Karen on the matter, Perry leaves, feeling betrayed.

Returning to his hotel room, Perry is enraged to find his room filled with strangers. He angrily confronts Gary, who accuses him of being no fun anymore. Retreating to his room for a nap, he soon wakes up when Christy enters and talks about their past relationship. Perry recalls how his record label dumped him despite him putting much effort into their album; Christy remarks that she loved the record anyway. When she begins making romantic advances, Perry refuses and instead decides to play her a song he wrote: "Ordinary World", but is interrupted when Gary calls Perry into the main room for a concert.

Perry is excited to see his old band formed together again; however, Gary reveals that his position has been replaced with another singer. Infuriated, he smashes Salome's guitar as the police come to stop the party. Perry is handcuffed and confronts Gary about replacing him in the band. Gary says he was forced to when Perry walked out on them because his wife was pregnant, despite a tour already lined up. After being released from custody due to being friends with the police chief, he starts rushing to Salome's talent show; however, Christy runs after him and offers to let him play Ordinary World for Joan Jett, imploring that she will love it. Perry chooses to go to the talent show despite the chance to revive his career.

At the talent show, Salome is forced to use Perry's old guitar. Perry is able to make it in time to the show and is elated to see his daughter performing, who performs an acoustic version of "Unsatisfied" by The Replacements. At home, an angry Karen reveals that his actual birthday is the next day; Perry had confused the dates by thinking his birthday was the same day as the talent show. Karen's parents thank him for loving their daughter so much, and, using a tip from her dad, Perry offers to sleep on the couch. Karen finally forgives him and offers to watch House Hunters.

The next day, Perry takes Salome to a guitar shop and trades his prized guitar from his old days for a limited edition electric guitar for her, which Salome is ecstatic about. As they all get into the car, Perry asks what music they should listen to; Salome excitedly tells him to play "Devil's Kind".

Cast 
 Billie Joe Armstrong as Perry Miller 
 Selma Blair as Karen Miller
 Judy Greer as Christy
 Chris Messina as Jake Miller
 Fred Armisen as Gary 
 John Doman as Walt
 Brian Baumgartner as Rupert
 Madisyn Shipman as Salome Miller
 Dallas Roberts as Mickey
 Kevin Corrigan as Pete
 Sean Gunn as Ted
 Lucas Papaelias as Johnny
 Joan Jett as herself

Production 
In November 2014, it was announced Billie Joe Armstrong, Judy Greer, Fred Armisen, Selma Blair, Dallas Roberts, Chris Messina and Brian Baumgartner had joined the cast of the film, with Lee Kirk directing from a screenplay he wrote, Tim Perell, Alex A. Ginzburg and Tony Lee are serving as producers on the film. Dickon Hinchliffe composed the film's score. Armstrong wrote four original songs for the soundtrack: "Devil's Kind", "Ordinary World", "Body Bag", and "Fever Blister". "Ordinary World" went on to appear on the Green Day album Revolution Radio (2016), while "Body Bag" was released by Armstrong's side-project, The Longshot, for their album, Love Is For Losers. Shortly after the release of Love Is For Losers, The Longshot released "Devil's Kind" as a stand-alone single  and "Fever Blister" as part of their Razor Baby- EP (2018)

Release
The film had its world premiere at the Tribeca Film Festival on April 23, 2016. 
Shortly after, Universal Pictures acquired distribution rights to the film, and set the film for an October 14, 2016, limited release and worldwide video on demand.

Reception
Ordinary World has received mixed reviews from critics. On Rotten Tomatoes it has a score of 47% based on 14 reviews, with an average rating of 5.3/10.

Frank Scheck of The Hollywood Reporter called it "raggedly enjoyable thanks to the unexpected charms of its leading man".

References

External links 
 

American comedy-drama films
American independent films
American rock music films
Films about percussion and percussionists
Films set in 1995
Films set in 2015
Films set in Manhattan
Films set in New York City
Green Day
Midlife crisis films
Universal Pictures films
2010s English-language films
2010s American films